{{DISPLAYTITLE:C23H30O3}}
The molecular formula C23H30O3 (molar mass: 354.48 g/mol, exact mass: 354.2195 u) may refer to:

 Etretinate
 Melengestrol
 Levonorgestrel acetate (LNG-A)
 Prorenone

Molecular formulas